An inland harbor (or inland harbour) is a harbor that is quite far away from the ocean or sea, such as Berlin, Germany or Paris, France. Inland harbors are connected to a large body of water by an important river or canal passing near the center of the city. 

The Danube in Europe, the Mississippi River in the United States, and the Yangtze River in the People's Republic of China are transportation routes for many cities in each case.

Ports and harbours